Put Your Hands Up! (also titled as Put Your Hands Up! The Tribute Concert to Chuck Brown, named by Jahi Banks through a local contest held by TMOTTGOGO. ) is a double-live-tribute album released on August 20, 2002, by the Washington, D.C.-based go-go musician Chuck Brown. The album was recorded live at the 9:30 Club in Washington, D.C., and is a continuation of the 2001 album Your Game...Live at the 9:30 Club. The live performances was a collaboration between Chuck Brown and some of the musicians that were influenced by his works. The album consists of go-go renditions of classic neo soul, go-go, hip hop, and blues songs.

Track listing

Personnel
Adapted from AllMusic

 Chuck Brown – lead vocals, electric guitar
 John M. Buchannan – keyboards, trombone
 Leroy Fleming – tenor saxophone, vocals
 Curtis Johnson – keyboards
 Donald Tillery – trumpet, vocals
 Ricardo D. Wellman – drums
 Rowland Smith – congas, vocals
 Glenn Ellis – bass guitar, percussion
 Cherie Mitchell – keyboards
 Louie Oxley – keyboards
 E.U. – guest artist
 Gregory "Sugar Bear" Elliott – bass guitar, guest vocals
 Kent Wood – keyboards
 Tony Fisher – guest artist
 911 – guest artist
 BackYard Band – guest artist
 Little Benny – guest artist
 Byron "B.J." Jackson – bass guitar
 Brad Clements – trumpet
 Dave "32" Ellis – guest vocals
 Glenn Ellis – bass guitar
 Robert Green – percussion
 Jim McFalls – trombone
 Bryan Mills – keyboards, saxophone

References

External links
 Put Your Hands Up! at Discogs

2002 live albums
Chuck Brown albums
Tribute albums
Live rhythm and blues albums